Antonis Bourselis (born 6 July 1994) is a Greek professional footballer who plays as an attacking midfielder for Super League 2 club Chania.

Career 
Bourselis began his football career in the youth teams of his local side Ergotelis and signed his first professional contract with the club, on 28 January 2013. He made his debut for the club on 17 August 2013 in the 2013–14 Superleague opening match against Atromitos. On 15 January 2014, Bourselis was loaned out to Gamma Ethniki side P.A.O. Krousonas for the remainder of the season, in order to get more playing time. He made a total of 15 appearances for P.A.O. Krousonas, all as a starter. 
 
On 17 October 2015, Bourselis scored his first goal for Ergotelis, in a Football League match against Larissa. In January 2016, and after Ergotelis withdrew from professional competitions as a result of unbearable financial obligations, Bourselis, who had been one of the 17 players still remaining in the club's roster, signed with local Football League 2 side OFI.
He spent an injury-ridden 1,5 years with OFI in both the Gamma Ethniki (8 caps) and the Football League (6 caps, plus another two in the Greek Football Cup), before returning to Ergotelis in the summer of 2017.

Career statistics

Honours
OFI
Gamma Ethniki: 2015–16

References

External links
 

1994 births
Living people
Footballers from Heraklion
Greek footballers
Super League Greece players
Football League (Greece) players
Ergotelis F.C. players
OFI Crete F.C. players
Association football midfielders